The Battle of Fort Albany in 1693 was the successful recapture by English forces of the Hudson's Bay Company trading outpost at Fort Albany in the southern reaches of Hudson Bay.  The fort, captured by a French expedition in 1686 and held by them in a battle the next year, was briefly defended by five  Frenchmen, who then abandoned the fort and its stockpile of furs to a four-ship English fleet commanded by James Knight.

References

 

Fort Albany 1693
Fort Albany (1693)
Fort Albany (1693)
17th century in Canada
New France
Hudson's Bay Company
Fort Albany 1693
1693 in Canada